District is a district of the city of Huaibei, Anhui Province, China.

Administrative divisions
In the present, Xiangshan District has 12 subdistricts and 1 town.
12 Subdistricts

1 Town
 Qugou

References

Huaibei